Charles Leigh (1686–1749) of Leighton Buzzard, Bedfordshire was a British politician who sat in the House of Commons between 1710 and 1734.

Leigh was baptized on 28 March 1686, the third, but second surviving son of Thomas Leigh, 2nd Baron Leigh of Stoneleigh Abbey, Warwickshire and his second wife Eleanor Watson, daughter of Edward Watson, 2nd Baron Rockingham.  He was admitted at Inner Temple in 1701 and matriculated at Balliol College, Oxford on 18 May 1702, aged 16. In 1704, he succeeded his  uncle Hon. Charles Leigh and inherited the Leighton Buzzard estates in Bedfordshire. He married. Lady Barbara Lumley daughter of Richard Lumley, 1st Earl of Scarbrough in 1716. 
 
Leigh's father died  in November 1710, and  he stood at a by-election at Warwick on 13 December 1710 against the Greville interest. He was elected Member of Parliament in a contest and was classed as a Tory and named as a ‘worthy patriot’ who helped expose the mismanagements of the previous Whig government. He offended some Tories for abstaining on 24 January1712 when the House voted on the motion censuring the Duke of Marlborough for his ‘unwarrantable and illegal’ acceptance of money from bread contractors. As a result, he damaged his political standing at Warwick. He also voted 'whimsically' on 18 June 1713 against the French commerce bill. At the 1713 general election, he expected not to be put forward for Warwick, but made no attempt to find another constituency. In the following year his maternal uncle, Hon. Thomas Watson Wentworth, returned him for Higham Ferrers at a by-election on 12 March 1714 and he was returned again at the 1715 general election.
 
Having been a Tory who might often vote Whig, Leigh became a strong opponent of Walpole's administration and from 1715, voted against the Government in all recorded divisions. At the 1722 general election, he changed his  seat to Bedfordshire. In 1725, he voted against the restoration of Bolingbroke’s estates with four other Tories. He did not stand at the 1727 general election, but was returned for Bedfordshire  at a by-election on 16 February 1733. He voted against the Administration on the Excise Bill in 1733, and the repeal of the Septennial Act, in 1734. He was defeated at the 1734 general election and not stand again.

Leigh died without issue on 28 July 1749.

References

 

 

 

1686 births
1749 deaths
Members of the Parliament of Great Britain for English constituencies
British MPs 1710–1713
British MPs 1713–1715
British MPs 1715–1722
British MPs 1722–1727
British MPs 1727–1734